The Robinson Hospital is a health facility in Newal Road, Ballymoney, Northern Ireland. It is managed by the Northern Health and Social Care Trust.

History
The facility was financed by a gift from Samuel Robinson of Philadelphia, a founder of American Stores, in memory of his parents who came from Cloughmills. It was designed by Thomas Houston and was officially opened by the Duchess of Abercorn in September 1933. It joined the National Health Service in 1948. A new health centre adjacent to the hospital was opened by Lord Grey in May 1970 and an old x-ray department was converted into a hydrotherapy pool in 1975.

References 

Northern Health and Social Care Trust
Hospitals established in 1933
1933 establishments in Ireland
Hospital buildings completed in 1933
Health and Social Care (Northern Ireland) hospitals
Hospitals in County Antrim
Ballymoney